Roko Pelicarić (born 23 June 1998) is a Croatian water polo player. He is currently playing for VK Solaris. He is 6 ft 2 in (1.88 m) tall and weighs 190 lb (86 kg).

References

1998 births
Living people
Croatian male water polo players
Sportspeople from Zadar